Anibal João da Silva Melo (born September 5, 1955) is a writer, journalist, and was a member of the National Assembly of Angola. Now Melo is serving the position of the Ministro da Comunicação Social.

Early life and education
Anibal João Melo was born on September 5, 1955, in Luanda Province, Angola. His family included his father, Anibal de Melo; his mother, Helena Guerra; and his sister, Marina Melo. Because of his father's military career, he lived without his father for most of his childhood, because his father was fighting for Angolan independence from Portugal. He eventually reconnected with his father when he was fifteen. He attended Universidade Federal Fluminense, located in Niteroi province, Rio de Janeiro, Brasil, for a degree in Journalism.  In 1991, he graduated from his studies at Universidade Federal Fluminense, obtaining an undergraduate degree. In 1994, he obtained a master's degree in communication and culture from Universidade Federal do Rio de Janeiro.

Career
He has been a writer since 1985 with his first poem collection Definição, and has been writing ever since. Then He went on to join the National Assembly of Angola.

Publications
 Definição (1985)
 Fabulema (1986)
 Poemas Angolanos (1989)
 Tanto Amor (1989)
 Canção do Nosso Tempo (1991)
 O caçador de nuvens (1993)
 Limites e Redundâncias (1997)
 A luz mínima (2004)
 Todas as palavras (2006)
 Autorretrato (2007)
 Novos poemas de amor (2009)
 Cântico da terra e dos homens. Lisboa: Editorial Caminho, 2010.

Other works
Short stories were later added to his repertoire
 Imitação de Sartre e Simone de Beauvoir (1998)
 Filhos da Pátria (2001)

Honors
 Prémio Maboque de Jornalismo (2008)

References

1955 births
Angolan journalists
20th-century Angolan poets
Members of the National Assembly (Angola)
Federal University of Rio de Janeiro alumni
Living people
21st-century Angolan poets
Angolan male poets
20th-century male writers
21st-century male writers
Social Communication ministers of Angola